Abhyudaya Co-operative Bank Ltd is an urban multi-state Cooperative banking institution based in Maharashtra, India and operating as a co-operative bank since 1965.

History 

Within a short period of time Abhyudaya Co-op, Credit Society got converted into an Urban Co-operative bank. 
In June 1965 Abhyudaya Co-operative Bank Ltd was finally established as a full-fledged co-operative Bank. 
It was conferred with Scheduled bank status by the Reserve Bank of India in the year 1988. 
On 11 January 2007 the Bank was registered as a multi-state co-operative bank by the Central Registrar, New Delhi.

Branches 

It has branches in Metropolitan Mumbai, Navi Mumbai, Pune, Thane, Raigad, Nagpur, Nashik, Nanded, Kankavali and Aurangabad in Maharashtra State, Vadodara and Ahmedabad in Gujarat State, Udupi and Mangalore in Karnataka State.

The area of operation of the bank is confined to 3 States 
 Maharashtra  
 Gujarat 
 Karnataka.

The Bank further proposes to extend its area of operation to other States.

Acquisitions
 Pune based Citizens Co-op Bank 
 Vadodara based Shree Krishna Co-operative Bank 
 Ahmedabad based Manekchowk Co-operative Bank 
 Udupi based Janatha Co-op. Bank Ltd.

See also
Co-operative banking

References

External links
 Official website

Indian companies established in 1965
Cooperatives in Maharashtra
Cooperative banks of India
Banks established in 1965
Banks based in Mumbai
1965 establishments in Maharashtra